Rodrigo Hernán Barrera Funes (born March 30, 1970) is a retired Chilean footballer.

Career
Barrera played mostly for Universidad Católica. He is nicknamed Chamuca.

A striker at Universidad Católica and Universidad de Chile, he helped the squad to its greatest triumphs. He also played for Necaxa in Mexico. Apart from universities, Barrera played in Palestino and Deportes Melipilla in Chile. He is notable for his pace.

Barrera played several years with Universidad Católica. Due to continuous changes, he left the club. In 2004, when Universidad de Chile became champion, he was hired again by the club. However, he remained with the squad for only the Clausura 2004 tournament.

National team
Barrera represented Chile at under-20 level in the 1988 South American Championship. Four years later, he took part of Chile U23 in the 1992 Pre-Olympic Tournament.

He played for the Chile national football team and was a participant at the 1998 FIFA World Cup. He was capped 22 times, scoring 6 goals between 1993 and 1998, including a brace in a 3–3 tie against Argentina.

Honours

Club
Universidad Católica
 Copa Chile (2): 1985, 1995
 Primera División de Chile (1): 2002 Apertura

Necaxa
 Primera División de México (1): 1995–96

Universidad de Chile
 Primera División de Chile (2): 1999, 2000
 Copa Chile (2): 1998, 2000

References

External links
 
 
 
 Rodrigo Barrera at PlaymakerStats

1970 births
Living people
Footballers from Santiago
Chilean footballers
Chilean Primera División players
Liga MX players
Cypriot First Division players
Club Deportivo Universidad Católica footballers
Universidad de Chile footballers
Deportes Melipilla footballers
Club Deportivo Palestino footballers
Club Necaxa footballers
Olympiakos Nicosia players
Chile international footballers
Chile under-20 international footballers
1998 FIFA World Cup players
1993 Copa América players
1995 Copa América players
Chilean expatriate footballers
Chilean expatriate sportspeople in Mexico
Chilean expatriate sportspeople in Cyprus
Expatriate footballers in Mexico
Expatriate footballers in Cyprus
Association football forwards